The A-135 (renamed to A-235) (NATO: ABM-4 Gorgon) is a Russian anti-ballistic missile system deployed around Moscow to intercept incoming warheads targeting the city or its surrounding areas. The system was designed in the Soviet Union and entered service in 1995. It is a successor to the previous A-35, and complies with the 1972 Anti-Ballistic Missile Treaty.

The system is operated by the 9th Division of Anti-Missile Defence, part of the Air Defence and Missile Defence Command of the Russian Aerospace Defence Forces.

History
A memo from the archives of Vitalii Leonidovich Kataev, written around 1985, had envisaged that the system "will be completed in 1987 to provide protection from a strike of 1–2 modern and prospective ICBMs and up to 35 Pershing 2-type intermediate-range missiles".

The A-135 system attained "alert" (operational) status on February 17, 1995. It is operational although its 51T6 component was deactivated in February 2007. A newer missile (PRS-1M) is expected to replace it. There is an operational test version of the system at the Sary Shagan test site in Kazakhstan.

Testing
In November 2017, a successful test of the 53T6 interceptor was carried out. Target speed up to 3 kilometers per second (53T6 speed 3), acceleration overload – 100 G, preload maneuvering – 210 G.

Structure

A-135 consists of the Don-2N battle management radar and two types of ABM missiles. It gets its data from the wider Russian early-warning radar network, that are sent to the command centre which then forwards tracking data to the Don-2N radar. The Don-2N radar is a large battle-management phased array radar with 360° coverage. Tests were undertaken at the prototype Don-2NP in Sary Shagan in 2007 to upgrade its software.

Russian early-warning radar network consists of:

 Daryal bistatic active phased array early-warning radars
 Dnepr/Dnestr space surveillance early-warning radars
 Voronezh phased array early-warning radars
 US-KMO, US-K and EKS early-warning satellites
 Command, control, communications and intelligence services

Deployment
There are at least 68 active launchers of short-range 53T6 endoatmospheric interceptor nuclear armed missiles, 12 or 16 missiles each, deployed at five launch sites. These are tested roughly annually at the Sary Shagan test site. In addition, 16 retired launchers of long-range 51T6 exoatmospheric interceptor nuclear armed missiles, 8 missiles each, are located at two launch sites.

Successor
The successor system, dubbed 'Samolet-M' (and more recently A-235) will employ a new, conventional, variant of the 53T6 missile to be deployed in the former 51T6 silos. The new PRS-1M is a modernized variant of the PRS-1 (53T6) and can use nuclear or conventional warheads. It can hit targets at ranges of 350 km and altitudes of 50 km.

Gallery

See also
 Main Centre for Missile Attack Warning
 A-35 anti-ballistic missile system
 A-235 anti-ballistic missile system
 Ground-Based Midcourse Defense

References

External links

 .
 .

Anti-ballistic missiles of the Soviet Union
Anti-ballistic missiles of Russia
Missile defense
NPO Novator products
Military equipment introduced in the 1990s